Jalalabad-e Dezak (also Romanized as Jalālābād-e Dezak; also known as Jalālābād, Jalālābād-e Now, and Jalal Abad Rastagh) is a village in Rostaq Rural District, in the Central District of Saduq County, Yazd Province, Iran. At the 2006 census, its population was 135 in 33 families.

References 

Populated places in Saduq County